Maurice Pic was a French politician. Pic was born 15 February 1913 in Saint-Christol, Vaucluse Department and died 13 January 1991 in Montélimar, Drôme Department.

References

1913 births
1991 deaths
Senators of Drôme
People from Vaucluse